The Noosa Journal was a local newspaper, for Noosa, Australia. It was purchased by News Limited in 2006. It was closed by the company in 2012.

References

2012 disestablishments in Australia
Defunct newspapers published in Queensland
2006 mergers and acquisitions